Lev B. Levitin is a Russian-American engineer currently a Distinguished Professor at Boston University and a Life Fellow of the IEEE. His current research interests include information theory, physical aspects of computation, complex systems and quantum measurement. He is known for the Margolus–Levitin theorem.

References

Year of birth missing (living people)
Living people
Boston University faculty
Fellow Members of the IEEE
Russian engineers
American electrical engineers